José Mujica may refer to:
 José Mujica (born 1935), Uruguayan farmer and politician
 José Mujica (baseball) (born 1996), Venezuelan professional baseball pitcher